Keith Baker (born 17 April 1950) is a drummer, best known for a brief stint with Uriah Heep. He played for Bakerloo, but left the group following the release of its only album. He subsequently became the first drummer of Supertramp (then called Daddy) between late 1969 and early 1970. Baker joined Uriah Heep prior to their second album Salisbury, replacing Nigel Olsson. He recorded the album with the group, but left when he did not want to tour extensively with the band and was replaced by Ian Clark.

Discography
 Bakerloo (Bakerloo)
 New Hovering Dog (B.J. Cole)
 Dynamite (Carla Rugg)
 Salisbury (Uriah Heep)
 Very 'eavy... Very 'umble (Uriah Heep)

References

1948 births
English rock drummers
Living people
Uriah Heep (band) members
Supertramp members